Vegetarian may refer to:

 Vegetarianism, a plant only diet
 Vegetarian cuisine
 Vegetarian diet (disambiguation)
 The Vegetarian, a South Korean novella
 Vegetarian (film), a 2010 South Korean film 
 Operation Vegetarian, a 1942 British military plan

See also
 Herbivore
 Veganism